Andrea Lovotti (born 28 July 1989) is an Italian rugby union player who plays as a Prop. He currently plays for Colorno in Top10.

He grew up in the youth sporting team of Piacenza Gossolengo, in 2008-09 season he passed to Rugby Calvisano. After beginning down the ranks of the Italian system he returned to his previous youth club Calvisano at the top flight of the National Championship of Excellence where he immediately won the title of Champion of Italy and the Excellence Trophy. In May 2014, it was announced that he moved to Zebre.
He played for Zebre until 2021–22 United Rugby Championship season. 

In 2009 Lovotti was named in the Italy Under 20 squad and from 2012 to 2014 he was part of Emerging Italy squad.

On 4 June 2015, he was named in the training squad for the 2015 Rugby World Cup., but he didn't play. In 2016 Lovotti had the first call with Italy.
On 18 August 2019, he was named in the final 31-man squad for the 2019 Rugby World Cup. He was sent off against South Africa in the 2019 Rugby World Cup group stages for a spear tackle on Springbok No 8 Duane Vermuelen after the whistle had been blown. Such "crass stupidity" in the words of Italy coach Conor O'Shea cost Italy the match.

Honours
National Championship of Excellence
Champions Calvisano: 2010-2011
Coppa Italia
Champions Calvisano: 2010-2011

References

External links
It's Rugby England Profile

1989 births
Italian rugby union players
Sportspeople from Piacenza
Living people
Rugby Calvisano players
Zebre Parma players
Rugby union props
Italy international rugby union players